Vidyasagar or Vidya Sagar may refer to:

People 
Acharya Vidyasagar (born 1946), prominent Digambar Jain Acharya (1946-)
Ishwar Chandra Vidyasagar (1820–1891), Bengali scholar
Vidyasagar (composer) (born 1963), South Indian music director
Ch. Vidyasagar Rao, an Indian politician.
Mathukumalli Vidyasagar (born 1947), control theorist
Nitya Vidyasagar (born 1985), Indian-American actress and Sesame Street former cast member
Vidya Sagar Pandya, an Indian banker and politician

Other 
Vidyasagar Setu, commonly known as the Second Hooghly Bridge, a bridge in West Bengal, India linking Howrah to Kolkata
Vidyasagar University, in	Paschim Medinipur district, West Bengal, India
Vidyasagar (1950 film), a 1950 Bengali language movie starring Anup Kumar

Indian given names